Richard Braine may refer to:

 Richard Braine (politician) (born 1968), British politician, briefly leader of the UK Independence Party (UKIP)
 Richard Braine (actor) (born 1956), British actor, playwright and theatre director